Barrat is a French surname. Notable people with the surname include:

Claude Barrat (c. 1658 – c. 1711), Canadian legal professional
Georgie Barrat (1989), British tech journalist and television presenter
James Barrat (1960), American documentary filmmaker, speaker, and author
Martine Barrat (1933), French photographer, actress, dancer and writer
Rex Barrat (1914–1974), French artist known especially for his landscape paintings
Robert Barrat (1889–1970), American stage, motion picture, and television character actor

French-language surnames